Acanthosomatidae is a family of Hemiptera, commonly named "shield bugs" or "stink bugs", for which Kumar in his 1979 world revision recognized 47 genera; now this number is 55 genera, with about 200 species, and is one of the least diversified families within Pentatomoidea. The Acanthosomatidae species are found throughout the world, with the majority in the temperate regions of the Northern Hemisphere.

One of the most well-known species in the Acanthosomatidae family is the hawthorn shield bug (Acanthosoma haemorrhoidale), which is found throughout Europe and also northern Siberia; this species is typically green or brown in color and has a distinctive shape with two projections on its thorax. It feeds on a variety of plants, including hawthorn, rowan, and cherry. Another species in the Acanthosomatidae family is the spiny shield bug (Picromerus bidens), which is found throughout Europe, Asia, and North Africa. It is characterized by its spiny body, which is usually green or brown in color, and it feeds on a variety of plants, including nettle, raspberry, and thistle.

Description
These bugs are characterized by their shield-shaped bodies, which are often adorned with spines or projections, and their ability to emit a foul-smelling liquid when threatened.

Habitat
Acanthosomatidae are found in a variety of habitats, including forests, grasslands, and fields.

Genera
Examples of genera and species:
Acanthosoma Curtis, 1824
Acanthosoma haemorrhoidale (Linnaeus, 1758) — Hawthorn shield bug
Acanthosoma labiduroides Jakovlev, 1880 — Green shield bug
Cyphostethus Fieber, 1860
Cyphostethus tristriatus — Juniper shield bug
Elasmostethus Fieber, 1860
Elasmostethus interstinctus — Birch shield bug
Elasmostethus minor
Elasmucha Stål, 1864
Elasmucha cordillera Thomas, 1991
Elasmucha ferrugata (Fabricius, 1787)
Elasmucha fieberi (Jakovlev, 1864)
Elasmucha flammatum (Distant, 1893)
Elasmucha grisea (Linnaeus, 1758) — Parent bug
Elasmucha lateralis (Say, 1831)
Eupolemus
Oncacontias Breddin, 1903
Oncacontias vittatus — Forest shield bug

Ecology and use
Like other shield bugs, Acanthosomatidae play an important role in their ecosystems. They help to control insect populations, and their feeding habits can influence the growth and development of plants. However, they can also be considered pests in agricultural fields and gardens, where they may cause damage to crops.

In addition to their ecological significance, Acanthosomatidae have also been studied for their potential medicinal properties. Research has shown that the secretions produced by some species of Acanthosomatidae contain compounds that have anti-inflammatory and anti-tumor properties, making them potentially useful in the development of new drugs.

References

 
Heteroptera families